Beth McCluskey is an Irish mountain bike racer, cyclocross racer, road racer, mountain runner and adventure racer.

Titles 

2007 2009
 Irish champion in Olympic format cross-country cycling
2016 and 2017
Irish champion in cyclocross racing

References 

Irish mountain bikers
Irish female cyclists
1971 births
Living people